Naturalization Act may refer to:
 Naturalization Act of 1790
 Naturalization Act of 1795
 Naturalization Act of 1798, part of the Alien and Sedition Acts
 Naturalization Act of 1870
 Naturalization Act of 1906

United States federal immigration and nationality legislation